Lê Sỹ Mạnh (born December 2, 1984) is a Vietnamese striker who plays for Thanh Hóa F.C. In 2012, he was called up for the Vietnam national football team to play in the 2012 AFF Suzuki Cup.

In September 2017 he was involved in an incident with Vietnam national football team goalkeeper Đặng Văn Lâm, who after being threatened by Lê Sỹ Mạnh, ran away and injured his ankle.

References

1984 births
Living people
Vietnamese footballers
Vietnam international footballers
Hanoi FC players
Xuan Thanh Saigon Cement FC players
Thanh Hóa FC players
V.League 1 players
Association football forwards